Foucaucourt may refer to the following municipalities in France :

 Foucaucourt-en-Santerre, in the Somme department
 Foucaucourt-Hors-Nesle, in the Somme department
 Foucaucourt-sur-Thabas, in the Meuse department

Aerodromes
 Foucaucourt Aerodrome, a temporary World War I airfield near Foucaucourt-en-Santerre in the Somme department
 Foucaucourt Aerodrome, a temporary World War I airfield near Foucaucourt-sur-Thabas in the Meuse department